"Number One Enemy" is the debut single from British singer Daisy Dares You. The single features Chipmunk, and was released on 1 March 2010. The song peaked at number 13, it make her only charting single to date.

Music video
A music video is available for the song. The video features Daisy dancing around a colourfully decorated garden, and later features her dancing around a decorated stairwell. During his verse, Chipmunk is seen sat at a long wooden table, in which Daisy is stood dancing behind him. Various odd objects appear throughout the video, including a giant cupcake and rainbow-coloured sheep.  The video seems to be inspired in parts by Lewis Carroll's Alice's Adventures in Wonderland and Through the Looking-Glass and What Alice Found There, as seen by Daisy holding a pig, the long table (reminiscent of the tea party table) and Chipmunk holding a hat similar to the Mad Hatter's.  We also see Daisy encountering a white rabbit and following it down a rabbit hole at the start, a small bottle reading "Drink Me", signs saying "This Way" and "That Way", a small house (reminiscent of when Alice grows larger whilst inside the White Rabbit's house) and oversized or just plain out-of-the-ordinary objects and surroundings.

In popular culture 
The song was re-recorded in Simlish for the video game, The Sims 3: Ambitions.

Critical reception 
Nick Levine of Digital Spy gave the song a positive review.

Chart performance
Following its release on 1 March 2010, "Number One Enemy" debuted in the UK Singles Chart on 7 March 2010, where it peaked at #13. The following week, the single fell 6 places to #19. On 21 March 2010, the single fell a further 8 places to #27 and the following week fell a further 7 places to #34, meaning the single spent 4 weeks in the UK Top 40. On 20 March 2010, "Number One Enemy" debuted in the European Hot 100 Singles where it peaked at #40

Release history

References

		

2010 singles
Chipmunk (rapper) songs
2009 songs
Songs written by Chip (rapper)
Jive Records singles